Four Star Playhouse is a radio dramatic anthology series in the United States. The 30-minute program was broadcast on NBC beginning in July 1949 and was sustaining. It lasted only three months.<ref>"W. C. Hiatus Starters Feeling NBC Axe". The Billboard. August 27, 1949. P. 7.</ref>Four Star Playhouse was one of "at least 10" new programs developed for that summer by NBC's [West] Coast programming department. A story in the July 2, 1949, issue of The Billboard reported that NBC "is now keyed to the recent programming drive, launched to offset Columbia Broadcasting System's (CBS) talent raids, and is anxious to use summer hiatus periods to develop shows worthy of fall bankrolling. Hence, the new raft of airers will not be treated as fill-in shows, but produced with an eye to long-term web tenancy."
Radio historian John Dunning put the production surge in context:The Four Star Playhouse was a 1949 NBC effort ... quickly put together as part of the network's barrage against CBS. During the previous summer, CBS had raided the top of NBC's comedy line, luring Jack Benny, "Amos and Andy," and others into a network jump. NBC's reaction was almost frantic: a battery of new shows like this one, featuring glamor and lots of big names.
Other NBC shows developed as a part of that effort included Hollywood Calling, Screen Directors Playhouse, Dragnet, Richard Diamond and Trouble with the Truitts.

Despite the star power of the show's four featured artists, Dunning noted, "the new NBC lineup just couldn't compete against the old, which CBS stacked into the same time slots on Sunday. Most of the new shows vanished from the air within months, and The Four Star Playhouse was one of them."
Three years after Four Star Playhouse's demise on radio, the same format was used -- with different stars -- for a TV version that ran for four years. See Four Star Playhouse.

 Format and Cast 

The show's title came from the fact that it was built around "four major film stars, each of whom was featured in turn in the weekly presentations." They were Fred MacMurray, Loretta Young, Rosalind Russell and Robert Cummings.
As an anthology series, Four Star Playhouse did not have a standard cast. However, many radio actors and actresses of that time appeared in episodes. They included Elliot Lewis, Shirley Mitchell, Paul Frees, Ross Taylor, Will Wright, Lurene Tuttle, William Conrad, Wilms Herbert, Lawrence Dobkin, Betty Moran, Frank Lovejoy, George Neise, Janet Waldo, Jeanne Bates, Joe DuVal, Willard Waterman, Jack Edwards, Mary Jane Croft, Frank Nelson, Charles Seel, Herb Butterfield, Jeff Chandler, Shepard Menken, Dan O'Herlihy and Ken Christy.  Frank Barton was the announcer.
Episodes were adapted by writer Milton Geiger from short stories in Cosmopolitan'' magazine.

Episodes 

The series' entire run consisted of 12 episodes. Their dates, titles and stars were as follows:

References

External links 
 Six episodes of Four Star Playhouse are available online from archive.org.

1940s American radio programs
American radio dramas
NBC radio programs
Anthology radio series
Radio programs adapted into television shows